Burkina Faso competed at the 2016 Summer Olympics in Rio de Janeiro, Brazil, from 5 to 21 August 2016. This was the nation's ninth appearance at the Summer Olympics, having participated since the 1972 Summer Olympics in Munich under the name Upper Volta.

Five Burkinabe athletes, three men and two women, were selected to the team, tying the record for the nation's roster size with London 2012. Two of them returned for their second Olympic appearance from the previous Games: hurdler Marthe Koala and freestyle swimmer Angelika Ouedraogo. Meanwhile, heavyweight judoka Rachid Sidibé led the team as Burkina Faso's flag bearer in the opening ceremony.

Burkina Faso, however, had to wait for five more years until winning its first Olympic medal.

Athletics

Burkina Faso received universality slots from IAAF to send two athletes (one male and one female) to the Olympics.

Track & road events

Field events

Judo

Burkina Faso qualified one judoka for the men's heavyweight category (+100 kg) at the Games. Rachid Sidibe earned a continental quota spot from the African region as Burkina Faso's top-ranked judoka outside of direct qualifying position in the IJF World Ranking List of May 30, 2016.

Swimming

Burkina Faso received a Universality invitation from FINA to send two swimmers (one male and one female) to the Olympics.

References

External links

 
 

Nations at the 2016 Summer Olympics
2016
Olympics